was a modern-style court of justice introduced in Denmark, specifically for Copenhagen, by Johann Friedrich Struensee in 1771. It was replaced by the Københavns Byret and Østre Landsret in 1919.

History
It was formally established by royal charter of 15 June 1771. Henrik Stampe was active in its practical implementation. It replaced ,  (aka ),  and Tamperretten.

In 1805, Denmark's four existing  in Ringsted, Maribo, Odense and Viborg were replaced by two .

Location
When it proved impossible to find the necessary space,  was instead referred to rented premises in the Plessen Mansion. In 1774, after these premises had also proven too small, a building was acquired on Østergade. In 1816,  relocated to the new City Hall on Nytorv.

Organization
 introduced new principles to the Danish court system, especially by being divided into separate investigative and judicial departments. Each of the judicial divisions had five judges on a fixed salary, who were banned from holding other administrative offices.

People

Presidents
 (1771–1781) Frederik Horn
 (1771–1788) Anker Andreas Suhm
 (1788–1789) Oluf Lundt Bang
 (1789–1798) Enevold Berregaard Fogh
 (1798–1805) Carl Vigand Falbe

Secretaries
 (1771–1785) Frederik Christian Mahling
 (1785–1803) Frederik Horn
 (1804–1805) Christian Frederik Bang

Judges
 

 (1771–1781) Anker Andreas Suhm
 (1771–1788) Truels Ortved
 (1771–1788) Enevold Berregård Liigge
 (1771–1789) Enevold Berregaard Fogh 
 (1771–1797) Carl Vigand Falbe
 (1771–1805) Hans Heger
 (1771–1772) Christian Frederik Jacobi
 (1771–1805) Nicolai Stabel
 (1771–1773) Johan Bartholin Eichel 
 (1771–1772) Hans Jacob Hiort
 (1771–1772) Knud Holtermann
 (1771–1775) Ole Christopher Wessel
 (1772–1797) Herman Andreas Pitzler
 (1772–1773) Christen Schow
 (1772–1778) Ole Pedersen Rested 
 (1772–1774) Peter Guldencrone
 (1773–1781) Jørgen Christopher Drewsen
 (1773–1801) Andreas Bang
 (1775–1778) Mads Fridsch
 (1777–1782) Friedrich Gottlieb Sporon
 (1778–1782) Peter Feddersen
 (1778–1781) Jacob Henric Schou
 (1780–1796) Ole Thestrup
 (1779–1805) Frederik Didrik Sechmann Fleischer
 (1781–1785) Georg Linde
 (1782–1805) Jacob Stendrup
 (1782–1805) Ditlev Frederik Feddersen
 (1772–1778) Peter Christian Zeuthen
 (1782–1805) Andreas Bjørn Rothe
 (1783–1800) Poul Frederik Beckmann
 (1788–1893) Anker Vilhelm Frederik Bornemann
 (1777–1805) Peter Wedege
 (1777–1805) Johan Henrik Barens
 (1790–1801) Jens Schifter
 (1790–1802) Frederik Winkel-Horn
 (1790–1796) Adam Gottlob Muller
 (1790–1797) Jørgen Lottrup Schydtz
 (1790–1801) Christian Rafn
 (1783–1797) Peter Collet
 (1784–1791) Hans Hagerup Falbe
 (1794–1805) Christian Henrik Carstens
 (1794–1801) Peter Christian Bagger
 (1795–1802) Bredo Henrik v.Munthe af Morgenstierne
 (1800–1805) Casper Friedrich Lassen
 (1801–1805) Jens Kras Høst
 (1801–1805) Anders Sandøe Ørsted
 (1802–1804) Peter Bangert
 (1802–1805) Poul Abraham Dall
 (1803–1805) Hans Casper Jacobsen
 (1804–1805) Herman Gerhard Treschow

References 

18th century in Danish law
19th century in Danish law
1771 establishments in Denmark
1919 disestablishments in Denmark